The 1973 Polish Speedway season was the 1973 season of motorcycle speedway in Poland.

Individual

Polish Individual Speedway Championship
The 1973 Individual Speedway Polish Championship final was held on 30 September at Rybnik.

Golden Helmet
The 1973 Golden Golden Helmet organised by the Polish Motor Union (PZM) was the 1973 event for the league's leading riders.

Calendar

Final classification
Note: Result from final score was subtracted with two the weakest events.

Junior Championship
 winner - Zbigniew Filipiak

Silver Helmet
 winner - Zbigniew Filipiak

Team

Team Speedway Polish Championship
The 1973 Team Speedway Polish Championship was the 1973 edition of the Team Polish Championship. 

Stal Gorzów Wielkopolski won the gold medal. The team included Zenon Plech and Edward Jancarz.

First League

Second League

References

Poland Individual
Poland Team
Speedway
1973 in Polish speedway